MTV Party To Go Volume 7 was the seventh album in the MTV Party To Go series.  The album was certified gold on April 10, 1996 by the RIAA.

Track listing
 "Freak Like Me" (LP Version) – Adina Howard
 "Human Nature" (Howie Tee Remix) – Madonna
 "Candy Rain" (Heavy D & Trackmasters Mix) – Soul for Real
 "Here Comes the Hotstepper" (Heartical Mix) – Ini Kamoze
 "This Is How We Do It" (LP Version) – Montell Jordan
 "Short Short Man" (Club Mix) – 20 Fingers
 "Thuggish Ruggish Bone" (EP Version) – Bone Thugs-N-Harmony
 "Dear Mama" (Radio Version) – 2Pac
 "Can't You See" (Vocal Version) – Total featuring The Notorious B.I.G.
 "I Wanna Be Down" (The Human Rhythm Hip Hop Remix) – Brandy
 "Freek'n You" (Freek-A-Pella Mix) – Jodeci
 "I'll Make Love to You" (LP Version) – Boyz II Men

Charts

Weekly charts

Year-end charts

References

MTV series albums
1995 compilation albums
Tommy Boy Records compilation albums
Dance-pop compilation albums